Juttadinteria simpsonii is a species of plant in the family Aizoaceae. It is endemic to Namibia.  Its natural habitats are rocky areas and cold desert. It is threatened by habitat loss.

References

Flora of Namibia
simpsonii
Least concern plants
Taxonomy articles created by Polbot
Taxa named by Kurt Dinter